Anastasiya Shvedova (née Ivanova; born 3 May 1979) is a Belarusian, formerly Russian, pole vaulter.

International competitions

See also
List of pole vault national champions (women)

References

 

1979 births
Living people
Athletes from Saint Petersburg
Russian female pole vaulters
Belarusian female pole vaulters
Olympic female pole vaulters
Olympic athletes of Russia
Olympic athletes of Belarus
Athletes (track and field) at the 2004 Summer Olympics
Athletes (track and field) at the 2012 Summer Olympics
Universiade medalists in athletics (track and field)
Universiade silver medalists for Russia
Medalists at the 2003 Summer Universiade
World Athletics Championships athletes for Belarus
Russian Athletics Championships winners